Kakwa Mountain is located on the border of Alberta and British Columbia. It was named in 1925 by Samuel P. Fay.

See also
 List of peaks on the Alberta–British Columbia border
 Mountains of Alberta
 Mountains of British Columbia

References

Two-thousanders of Alberta
Two-thousanders of British Columbia
Canadian Rockies